Septet is an album by pianist Chick Corea featuring music for string quartet, piano, flute and French horn recorded in 1984 and released on the ECM label.

Reception 

The album received a Grammy nomination for Best Contemporary Composition. The AllMusic review awarded the album 2 stars. The Penguin Guide to Jazz described it as "Po-faced and slight".

Track listing 
All compositions by Chick Corea
 "1st Movement" - 1:57 
 "2nd Movement" - 2:20 
 "3rd Movement" - 8:08 
 "4th Movement" - 5:31 
 "5th Movement" - 9:58 
 "The Temple of Isfahan" - 13:49 
Recorded at Mad Hatter Studios in Los Angeles, California in October, 1984

Personnel 
 Chick Corea — piano
 Steve Kujala — flute
 Peter Gordon — French horn
 Ida Kavafian — violin
 Theodore Arm — violin
 Steven Tenenbom — viola
 Fred Sherry — cello

References 

ECM Records albums
Chick Corea albums
1985 albums